The Soviet Union is a nation that competed at two consecutive Hopman Cup tournaments and first competed in the 2nd Hopman Cup in 1990. The Soviet Union never won a tie and as such never passed the quarterfinal stage of the tournament.

Since the dissolution of the Soviet Union at the end of 1991, four of the fifteen independent states formed from the former Soviet Union have competed in the Hopman Cup. These are: Kazakhstan, Russia, Ukraine and Uzbekistan. Additionally, the Commonwealth of Independent States also entered a team into the 1992 event.

Players
This is a list of players who have played for the Soviet Union in the Hopman Cup.

Results

References

See also
CIS at the Hopman Cup
Kazakhstan at the Hopman Cup
Russia at the Hopman Cup
Ukraine at the Hopman Cup
Uzbekistan at the Hopman Cup

Hopman Cup teams
Hopman Cup